Trofim, Trophimus or Trophimos, from τροφή (trophḗ, nourishment) is a given name. It may refer to:

 Trophimus the Ephesian, a Christian who accompanied Paul
 Trophimus of Arles (died 3rd century), first bishop and patron saint of Arles
 Trofim Lomakin (1924–1973), Russian weightlifter
 Trofim Lysenko (1898–1976), Soviet agrobiologist
 Trofim Kichko, Soviet author of Judaism Without Embellishment, a 1963 anti-Semitic book 
 Trophimus (died c. 278 AD), Christian martyr sharing feast day with Sabbatius and Dorymedon
 Trofim, secular name of Paul Meletiou (1880–1962), Belorusian bishop

See also 
 Sergei Trofimov, Russian singer
 Trofimov

Russian masculine given names